TT233 may refer to:

 a tomb of ancient Egypt.
 a model of transmitter.
 the designation for an airline scheduled flight, Tigerair Australia Flight TT233.

Sources